Mosgiel AFC is a semi-professional association football club in Mosgiel, New Zealand. They currently compete in the ODT FootballSouth Premier League.

Club history
The club was formed in 1913 and is based at Memorial Park. The club provides teams for men, women and juniors at all levels. The club's nickname, The Plainsmen, comes from Mosgiel's location on the Taieri Plains.

Mosgiel have twice reached the final of the Chatham Cup, in 1938 and 1940, but have never won the competition. In more recent times their best performance has been to reach the last 16 of the competition in 1985 and 2005.

Present day
The club is currently competing in the ODT FootballSouth Premier League.  Their best finish in the league was in the 2004 and again in the 2010 season, when they finished third.

External links
MosgielAFC Soccer Club Website
Footballsouth Mosgiel page

Association football clubs in Dunedin
Association football clubs established in 1913
Sport in Otago
1913 establishments in New Zealand
Mosgiel